The Ramer–Douglas–Peucker algorithm, also known as the Douglas–Peucker algorithm and iterative end-point fit algorithm, is an algorithm that decimates a curve composed of line segments to a similar curve with fewer points. It was one of the earliest successful algorithms developed for cartographic generalization.

Idea 
The purpose of the algorithm is, given a curve composed of line segments (which is also called a Polyline in some contexts), to find a similar curve with fewer points.  The algorithm defines 'dissimilar' based on the maximum distance between the original curve and the simplified curve (i.e., the Hausdorff distance between the curves).  The simplified curve consists of a subset of the points that defined the original curve.

Algorithm 

The starting curve is an ordered set of points or lines and the distance dimension .

The algorithm recursively divides the line. Initially it is given all the points between the first and last point. It automatically marks the first and last point to be kept. It then finds the point that is farthest from the line segment with the first and last points as end points; this point is obviously farthest on the curve from the approximating line segment between the end points.

The algorithm recursively calls itself with the first point and the farthest point and then with the farthest point and the last point, which includes the farthest point being marked as kept.

When the recursion is completed a new output curve can be generated consisting of all and only those points that have been marked as kept.

Non-parametric Ramer–Douglas–Peucker 
Like most line fitting, polygonal approximation or dominant point detection methods, it can be made non-parametric by using the error bound due to digitization and quantization as a termination condition.

Pseudocode 
Assuming the input is a one-based array:
 # source: https://karthaus.nl/rdp/
function DouglasPeucker(PointList[], epsilon)
    # Find the point with the maximum distance
    dmax = 0
    index = 0
    end = length(PointList)
    for i = 2 to (end - 1) {
        d = perpendicularDistance(PointList[i], Line(PointList[1], PointList[end])) 
        if (d > dmax) {
            index = i
            dmax = d
        }
    }

    ResultList[] = empty;

    # If max distance is greater than epsilon, recursively simplify
    if (dmax > epsilon) {
        # Recursive call
        recResults1[] = DouglasPeucker(PointList[1...index], epsilon)
        recResults2[] = DouglasPeucker(PointList[index...end], epsilon)

        # Build the result list
        ResultList[] = {recResults1[1...length(recResults1) - 1], recResults2[1...length(recResults2)]}
    } else {
        ResultList[] = {PointList[1], PointList[end]}
    }
    # Return the result
    return ResultList[]

Application 
The algorithm is used for the processing of vector graphics and cartographic generalization.  It does not always preserve the property of non-self-intersection for curves which has led to the development of variant algorithms.

The algorithm is widely used in robotics to perform simplification and denoising of range data acquired by a rotating range scanner; in this field it is known as the split-and-merge algorithm and is attributed to Duda and Hart.

Complexity 

The running time of this algorithm when run on a polyline consisting of  segments and  vertices is given by the recurrence  where  is the value of index in the pseudocode.

Using (fully or semi-) dynamic convex hull data structures, the simplification performed by the algorithm can be accomplished in  time.

Similar algorithms

Alternative algorithms for line simplification include:
 Visvalingam–Whyatt
 Reumann–Witkam
 Opheim simplification
 Lang simplification
 Zhao–Saalfeld

See also 
 Curve fitting

Further reading 

 
 
  UBC Tech Report TR-92-07 available at http://www.cs.ubc.ca/cgi-bin/tr/1992/TR-92-07

References

External links
 Boost.Geometry support Douglas–Peucker simplification algorithm
 Implementation of Ramer–Douglas–Peucker and many other simplification algorithms with open source licence in C++
 XSLT implementation of the algorithm for use with KML data.
 You can see the algorithm applied to a GPS log from a bike ride at the bottom of this page
 Interactive visualization of the algorithm
 Implementation in F#
 Ruby gem implementation
 JTS, Java Topology Suite, contains Java implementation of many algorithms, including the Douglas-Peucker algorithm
 Rosetta Code (Implementations in many languages)

Computer graphics algorithms
Geometric algorithms
Digital signal processing
Articles with example pseudocode